Calumet station may refer to:
 Calumet station (Illinois), East Hazel Crest, Illinois
 Calumet Air Force Station, near Phoenix, Michigan
 Calumet Fire Station, Calumet, Michigan

See also
Coast Guard Station Calumet Harbor
Calumet (disambiguation)